"Don't Come Back" is a song by Australian pop band Human Nature, released as the third and final single from their third album Human Nature in 2001.

The song is referenced in the Eskimo Joe song "Losing Friends Over Love", from their 2009 album Inshalla.

Track listing
 CD single (671413.2)
 "Don't Come Back"   (Murlyn Radio Remix) -3:37
 "Don't Come Back"   (Amen Radio Edit) -3:23
 "Don't Come Back"   (Amen Club Mix) -7:15
 "When We Were Young"  (Studio 347 Radio Remix) - 3:38
 Enhanced video medley: "When We Were Young"/"He Don't Love You" (TV Week Logie Awards 2001 Performance)

 Promo
 "Don't Come Back" (Amen Club Mix)	
 "Don't Come Back" (Amen Radio Edit)	
 "Don't Come Back" (Dub Mix)

Charts

External links
  at Discogs

References

2001 singles
2000 songs
Human Nature (band) songs
Songs written by Paul Begaud
Columbia Records singles
Songs written by Michael Tierney (musician)
Songs written by Andrew Tierney
Synth-pop ballads